The Green Fall River is a river in the U.S. states of Connecticut and Rhode Island. It flows approximately 13 km (8 mi).

Course
The river rises from a swamp south of Rockville Road (CT 138) in Voluntown. The river then flows due south to Green Fall Pond, then continues south through North Stonington and into Hopkinton, Rhode Island where the river converges with Parmenter Brook to form the Ashaway River.

Crossings
Below is a list of all crossings over the Green Fall River. The list starts at the headwaters and goes downstream.
Voluntown
Sand Hill Road/Green Fall Rd. just south of the Green Falls Pond Dam near the Rhode Island border.
North Stonington
Putker Road
Clarks Falls Road (CT 216) (Twice)

Tributaries
In addition to many unnamed tributaries, the following brooks also feed the Green Fall:
Peg Mill Brook
Palmer Pond Brook
Glade Brook

See also
List of rivers in Connecticut
List of rivers in Rhode Island

References

Maps from the United States Geological Survey

Rivers of New London County, Connecticut
Rivers of Washington County, Rhode Island
Hopkinton, Rhode Island
Voluntown, Connecticut
North Stonington, Connecticut
Rivers of Connecticut
Rivers of Rhode Island
Tributaries of Pawcatuck River
Wild and Scenic Rivers of the United States